The following Union Army units and commanders fought in the Battle of Cedar Creek of the American Civil War. Order of battle compiled from the army organization during the campaign. The Confederate order of battle is listed separately.

Abbreviations used

Military rank
 MG = Major General
 BG = Brigadier General
 Col = Colonel
 Ltc = Lieutenant Colonel
 Maj = Major
 Cpt = Captain

Other
 w = wounded
 mw = mortally wounded
 k = killed

Army of the Shenandoah

MG Philip Sheridan, Commanding
MG Horatio Wright

Escort:
 17th Pennsylvania Cavalry (detachment): Maj Weidner H. Spera
 6th U. S. Cavalry: Cpt Ira W. Claffin

VI Corps

BG James B. Ricketts (w)
 BG George W. Getty
 MG Horatio Wright

Escort:
1st Michigan Cavalry, Company G: Lieutenant William H. Wheeler

XIX Corps

BG William H. Emory

Army of West Virginia (VIII Corps)
BG George Crook

Cavalry Corps
BG Alfred T. A. Torbert

Escort:
  
1st Rhode Island: Maj William H. Turner, jr.

Notes

References

U.S. War Department, The War of the Rebellion: a Compilation of the Official Records of the Union and Confederate Armies, U.S. Government Printing Office, 1880–1901.
Dyer, Frederick H., A compendium of the War of the Rebellion, Volume 1, 1908, Des Moines IA

American Civil War orders of battle
Cedar Creek
Cedar Creek
Cedar Creek
Virginia in the American Civil War
Frederick County in the American Civil War
Shenandoah County in the American Civil War
Warren County in the American Civil War